The Royal Netherlands Academy of Arts and Sciences (Dutch: Koninklijke Nederlandse Akademie van Wetenschappen, abbreviated: KNAW) is an organization dedicated to the advancement of science and literature in the Netherlands. The academy is housed in the Trippenhuis in Amsterdam. Founded in 1808, members are appointed for life by co-optation.

List of members (I)

References 

Lists of members of the Royal Netherlands Academy of Arts and Sciences